Dedovka is a rural locality (a selo) in Novolimanskoye Rural Settlement, Petropavlovsky District, Voronezh Oblast, Russia. The population was 342 as of 2010. There are 3 streets.

Geography 
Dedovka is located on the left bank of the Don River, 28 km south of Petropavlovka (the district's administrative centre) by road. Dedovochka is the nearest rural locality.

References 

Rural localities in Petropavlovsky District, Voronezh Oblast